A dealing shoe or dealer's shoe is a gaming device, mainly used in casinos, to hold multiple decks of playing cards.  The shoe allows for more games to be played by reducing the time between shuffles and less chance of dealer cheating.  In some games, such as blackjack (where card counting is a possibility), using multiple decks of cards can increase the house edge.

History
Prior to 1961 in Las Vegas casinos, all blackjack was dealt from a single deck.  John Scarne proposed to the Nevada Gaming Control Board that a state ruling be enacted such that Blackjack must be dealt from a shoe (Scarne's invention).  While no such ruling was ever passed, most Nevada casinos now deal from a multi-deck shoe.  As gaming advisor to the Havana Hilton, Scarne also introduced the shoe to Puerto Rico and Cuba. The device is so named because the earliest versions of it resembled a woman's high-heel shoe, and were often painted red or black in color.

Usage
Dealing shoes come in many colors and sizes, depending on the number of decks they are capable of holding (2, 4, 6, or 8 decks).

When the cards are placed in the shoe, the dealer will insert a brightly colored blank plastic card.  When this card is drawn it indicates that the current game is the last one before a new shuffle.  This helps mitigate player advantage via card counting, as a significant portion (usually about 25 percent) of the full inventory of cards never comes into play. The percentage of cards that are dealt is sometimes called the penetration.

References

Bibliography

Gaming devices
Playing cards